The Rivers State Ministry of Finance is a government ministry of Rivers State, Nigeria that is charged with the responsibility of handling matters related to the finance administration of the state. The ministry's main goal is implementing government financial policies to ensure maximum productivity and positive impact on the lives of the citizens. Incumbent commissioner of the ministry is Barrister Isaac Kamalu appointed in 2019.

List of Finance Commissioners
2011: Chamberlain S. Peterside
2015: Fred Kpakol
2019: Isaac Kamalu

See also
List of government ministries of Rivers State

References

 
Finance
Finance ministries
Economy of Rivers State